Inoka Rohini de Silva also commonly known as Inoka Rohini (born around 1971) is a Sri Lankan former badminton player. 

De Silva was a national badminton champion at the women's doubles in 1995, 1996, 1998 partnering with Chandrika de Silva. Inoka Rohini has also represented Sri Lanka at the 1998 Commonwealth Games.

References

External links 

Year of birth missing (living people)
Living people
Place of birth missing (living people)
Sri Lankan female badminton players
Badminton players at the 1998 Commonwealth Games
Commonwealth Games competitors for Sri Lanka